The women's 880 yards event at the 1934 British Empire Games was held on 6 August at the White City Stadium in London, England. The distance was later discontinued for women until 1962.

Results

References

Athletics at the 1934 British Empire Games
1934